Thomas Haynes may refer to:

Thomas J. Haynes, general in the Rhode Island Air National Guard
Thomas Haynes (burgess), member of the Virginia House of Burgesses
Thomas Haynes, captain of HMS Lowestoffe

See also
Tom Haines (born 1998), English cricketer
Tommy Haynes (born 1952), American Olympic athlete
Thomas Hayne (disambiguation)